Sofiane Bendebka (born 9 August 1992) is an Algerian footballer who plays for Al-Fateh in the Saudi Professional League and the Algeria national team.

International career
On 2 June 2016, Bendebka made his senior international debut for Algeria in a 2017 Africa Cup of Nations qualifier against Seychelles, coming on as a 90th-minute substitute.

Career statistics

International goals
Scores and results list Algeria's goal tally first.

Honours
Algeria
FIFA Arab Cup: 2021

References

External links
 
 

Living people
1992 births
Algerian footballers
Algerian expatriate footballers
Algeria international footballers
Association football midfielders
MC Alger players
NA Hussein Dey players
Al-Fateh SC players
Algerian Ligue Professionnelle 1 players
Algerian Ligue 2 players
Saudi Professional League players
People from Hussein Dey District
Footballers at the 2016 Summer Olympics
Olympic footballers of Algeria
Footballers from Algiers
Expatriate footballers in Saudi Arabia
Algerian expatriate sportspeople in Saudi Arabia
21st-century Algerian people
2021 Africa Cup of Nations players